Gaddalakonda Ganesh is a 2019 Indian Telugu-language action comedy film directed by Harish Shankar and produced by Ram Achanta and Gopichand Achanta under the 14 Reels Plus banner. The film is an official remake of the 2014 Tamil film Jigarthanda which itself was inspired by the 2006 South Korean movie A Dirty Carnival. The film stars Varun Tej, Atharvaa, Pooja Hegde, and Mirnalini Ravi. The film marks the Telugu debut of Atharvaa and Mirnalini Ravi.

Gaddalakonda Ganesh was released on 20 September 2019. The film received positive response from both critics and audiences praising cast performances (particularly Varun Tej and Pooja Hegde), action, direction, story and screenplay. The film was commercially successful, grossing 45 crore at the box office. Originally titled Valmiki, the title was changed to Gaddalakonda Ganesh after several controversies and a legal dispute.

Plot 
In a cinema studio, an assistant director who aspires to become a film  director named Abhilash, aka Abhi is insulted by one of the directors, and there he challenges that he will become a good director with a good film in a few days. Another producer likes Abhi's hard work and suggests that he do a gangster movie. He decides to direct the biopic of a gangster. In search of a gangster, he finds the ruthless gangster named Gaddalakonda Ganesh, aka Gani lives in the town of Gaddalakonda. Abhi lands in Gaddalakonda and starts learning about Gani with the help of his friend Chintakayyi. Abhi traps Bujjama, the granddaughter of Gani's chef and she falls in love with Abhi, who realises this and reciprocates her feelings.
 
After some hilarious scenes, Abhi and Chintakayyi  befriends Thuppaki, one of Gani's henchmen. Later the duo learns that the Thuppaki is helping Prabhakar, one of Gani's rivals, to kill Gani for the position of Gani. However, Gani acknowledges this, plans and to kill Thuppaki. Gani also kidnaps Abhi and his friend. Abhi says the truth, and Gani feels happy that they were taking the biopic of him, and he narrates the whole story, including his criminal activities.
 
From childhood, Gani starts beating people for money. Later he does settlements for M.L.A. Gani, also a fan of Sridevi. Later, Gani falls for Sridevi, aka Devi, a computer student, but she doesn't accept him because of his aimless behaviour. Later she also reciprocates his feelings after he rescues her from ragging. But Devi's father refuses to accept their relationship due to the caste system. Devi and Gani decide to elope from Gaddalakonda, and Gani refuses to kill someone for the  M.L.A because he wants to leave behind his rowdyism. The M.L.A informs the police about Gani's whereabouts. The police come to the railway station and beat up Gani while Devi's father threatens Devi to marry the bridegroom whom he chose, otherwise he will order the police to kill Gani. Devi reluctantly marries a police officer who belongs to her caste. Another M.L.A, with the lawyer, comes to the police station and says that Gani's M.L.A had informed the police of Gani's whereabouts. He then goes to his M.L.A and slits his throat in front of his mother. Then Gani's mother complains against him. But Gani claims in court that his mother is a mute. From that day onwards, she refuses to speak with Gani.

Now, Bujjama learns about Abhi and confronts the latter. In the party for Abhi returning to Hyderabad, Bujjama expected Gani to act as a protagonist in his biopic. Gani agrees against to Abhi's wishes. However, Abhi changes his mind by listening to the theatre operator's words and his passion about directing a movie, but he can't do it due to his bad adaptation. Then Abhi appoints the acting coach Muni Manikyam for Gani and his gang. Later the acting coach praises Gani for his acting skill due to his ruthless behaviour, and also the acting coach humiliated Gani and his gang while they were training.

The shooting begins. The title of the film is Settimaar. By understanding the difficulties in directing the movie, Bujjama reconciles with Abhi. But things take a turn when Gani also changes his mind and falls for Bujjama. In the audio launch, Gani announced that he gifted a villa to Abhi and wants to marry Bujjama.

The movie is released and opens with a tremendous response. At the same time, Abhi elopes with Bujjama. Gani learns of this and decides to kill Abhi. Meanwhile, Gani's craze increases due to his acting skills. The people who fear Gani are now asking for selfies with him and his autograph. The little daughter of Thuppaki, who also fears when Gani comes to fondle her, gives a kiss and praises his acting skills. Gani's mother, who refused to talk to him in the past, speaks to him. By seeing all these, Gani spares Abhi and Bujjama and gives up his rowdy career. Prabhakar's henchman asks him to include him in Gani's next movie, which is being directed by Sukumar. Abhi's paternal uncle (Devi Prasad) takes Gani's criminal evidence (tape recorder and files) and hands it over to the D.C.P, who turns out to be Devi's husband. Devi takes the evidence (tape recorder) and grinds it in a blender. When the D.C.P asks Devi why she had ground the evidence, She replies that it's because the D.C.P couldn't keep his promise to not incriminate Gani, for which in return Devi wouldn't think about Gani. This indicates that Devi still loves Gani. Later, Devi also praises him. Abhi uses Gani's gang for threatening stars like Nithin to act in his film. Abhi marries Bujjama, and Gani remains single.

Cast 

 Varun Tej as Gaddalakonda Ganesh "Gani"
 Atharvaa as Abhilash "Abhi" 
 Pooja Hegde as Sridevi "Devi"
 Mirnalini Ravi as Bujjamma
 Supriya Pathak as  Gaddalakonda Ganesh's mother
 Brahmaji as Muni Manikyam, an acting coach
 Pradeep as Abhi's father
 Saraswathi as Abhi's mother
 Devi Prasad as Madhav Rao, Abhi's uncle
 Subbaraju as Prabhakar's henchman , Buchi Naidu's Follower
 Annapoorna as Gani's chef
 Tanikella Bharani as Chalam the theatre operator
 Satya as Kondamalli a.k.a. Chintakkayi, Abhilash's friend
 Raja Ravindra as Nallamandu Babji
 Raghu Babu as Producer 
 Prabhas Sreenu as Balijayya
 Shatru as Kasi
  Appaji Ambarisha Darbha  as Sridevi's father
 Fish Venkat as Khanberi Kantayya
 Brahmanandam in a cameo appearance
 Rao Ramesh in a cameo appearance
 Nithiin as himself (guest appearance)
 Sukumar as himself (guest appearance)
 Dimple Hayathi as an item number in the song "Jarra Jarra"

Production

Announcement 
On 26 January 2019, the film officially launched. Dil Raju, Sukumar graced the launch, and proceedings took place at Ramanaidu Film Studios.

The production on the film started from February 2019. Atharvaa joined on set for shooting in March 2019. Similarly involvement of Pooja Hegde was confirmed by the team in July. Mickey J. Meyer replaced Devi Sri Prasad as music director who was initially announced.

Soundtrack 

The soundtrack is composed by Mickey J. Meyer and lyrics by Bhaskarbhatla Ravikumar and Vanamali. The song "Elluvochi Godaramma" is a remix of the song "Yeluvachhi" from the 1982 film Devatha.

Controversies

Protests and release stalled 
Valmiki being from Boya Community, many people from that community protested against changing the name of the film as they are showing the lead actor in a negative role. When shooting for the film in Anantapur district of Andhra Pradesh, the Boya community attacked the film crew, and shooting was cancelled.

The release of the film was stalled in Anantapur and Kurnool districts of Andhra Pradesh by their respective district collectors as the Boya community was protesting for title change of the film.

Court case
In September 2019, Boya Hakkula Porata Samithi filed a petition in the Telangana High Court and Andhra Pradesh Valmiki Boya Sangam (APVBS) In AP High Court with PIL No:139/2019 by State General Secretary Kranthi Naidu Boya contending that the title hurt sentiments as the name of a great saint as Valmiki was being used for a character that donning the role of a villain.

Title change 

Due to many controversies over the film's title and release stalling in some areas, the title was changed to Gaddalakonda Ganesh only 6 hours prior to the release of the film.

Marketing and release
In June 2019, 14 Reels Plus released pre teaser on social media platforms. On 15 August 2019 the team released teaser and started promoting by releasing singles from the album. The official trailer of the film was unveiled by 14 Reels Plus on 9 September 2019.

The film was scheduled to be released on 13 September 2019, however to avoid direct clash with Gang Leader it was postponed by a week, scheduling the release on 20 September.

The Hindi dubbed version was premiered on Dhinchaak TV channel on 6 March 2022. The film was also dubbed in Malayalam as Gajarakotta Ganesha in 2022 and despite being a remake of the Tamil film Jigarthanda, was also dubbed in Tamil as Kazhugumalai Ganesan a year earlier in 2021.

Reception 
Gaddalakonda Ganesh received positive response from both critics and audiences praising cast performances (particularly Varun Tej and Pooja Hegde), action, direction, story and screenplay.
Neeshita Nyayapati writing for The Times of India has given 3.5/5 rating praising Varun Tej's performance as gangster.

Banda Kalyan writing for Sakshi gave 3/5 rating point out the only drawback of the film is forced comedy and how people are simply laughing onscreen while watching a film about a gangster.

Sangeetha Devi writing for The Hindu suggested this adaptation raises a toast to the cinema, more importantly showcases the power of the director.

References

External links 
 

2010s Telugu-language films
2019 films
Indian action comedy films
Indian gangster films
Films shot in Hyderabad, India
Films shot in Telangana
Telugu remakes of Tamil films
Films set in the 1980s